Puente Marqués de Ureña is a bridge located in San Fernando in the Province of Cádiz, Andalusia, Spain. It was built in the 18th century in honour of the Marqués de Ureña.

References

Buildings and structures in San Fernando, Cádiz
Bridges in Andalusia